Pyrrolysine (symbol Pyl or O; encoded by the 'amber' stop codon UAG) is an α-amino acid that is used in the biosynthesis of proteins in some methanogenic archaea and bacteria; it is not present in humans. It contains an α-amino group (which is in the protonated – form under biological conditions), a carboxylic acid group (which is in the deprotonated –COO− form under biological conditions). Its pyrroline side-chain is similar to that of lysine in being basic and positively charged at neutral pH.

Genetics
Nearly all genes are translated using only 20 standard amino acid building blocks.  Two unusual genetically-encoded amino acids are selenocysteine and pyrrolysine.  Pyrrolysine was discovered in 2002 at the active site of methyltransferase enzyme from a methane-producing archeon, Methanosarcina barkeri. This amino acid is encoded by UAG (normally a stop codon), and its synthesis and incorporation into protein is mediated via the biological machinery encoded by the pylTSBCD cluster of genes.

Composition
As determined by X-ray crystallography and MALDI mass spectrometry, pyrrolysine is made up of 4-methylpyrroline-5-carboxylate in amide linkage with the εN of lysine.

Synthesis
Pyrrolysine is synthesized in vivo by joining two molecules of L-lysine.  One molecule of lysine is first converted to (3R)-3-methyl-D-ornithine, which is then ligated to a second lysine. An NH2 group is eliminated, followed by  cyclization and dehydration step to yield L-pyrrolysine.

Catalytic function
The extra pyrroline ring is incorporated into the active site of several methyltransferases, where it is believed to rotate relatively freely.  It is believed that the ring is involved in positioning and displaying the methyl group of methylamine for attack by a corrinoid cofactor.  The proposed model is that a nearby carboxylic acid bearing residue, glutamate, becomes protonated, and the proton can then be transferred to the imine ring nitrogen, exposing the adjacent ring carbon to nucleophilic addition by methylamine.  The positively charged nitrogen created by this interaction may then interact with the deprotonated glutamate, causing a shift in ring orientation and exposing the methyl group derived from the methylamine to the binding cleft where it can interact with corrinoid.  In this way a net  is transferred to the cofactor's cobalt atom with a change of oxidation state from I to III.  The methylamine-derived ammonia is then released, restoring the original imine.

Genetic coding
Unlike posttranslational modifications of lysine such as hydroxylysine, methyllysine, and hypusine, pyrrolysine is incorporated during translation (protein synthesis) as directed by the genetic code, just like the standard amino acids.  It is encoded in mRNA by the UAG codon, which in most organisms is the 'amber' stop codon.  This requires only the presence of the pylT gene, which encodes an unusual transfer RNA (tRNA) with a CUA anticodon, and the pylS gene, which encodes a class II aminoacyl-tRNA synthetase that charges the pylT-derived tRNA with pyrrolysine.

This novel tRNA-aaRS pair ("orthogonal pair") is independent of other synthetases and tRNAs in Escherichia coli, and further possesses some flexibility in the range of amino acids processed, making it an attractive tool to allow the placement of a possibly wide range of functional chemical groups at arbitrarily specified locations in modified proteins.  For example, the system provided one of two fluorophores incorporated site-specifically within calmodulin to allow the real-time examination of changes within the protein by FRET spectroscopy, and site-specific introduction of a photocaged lysine derivative.  (See Expanded genetic code)

Evolution
The pylT and pylS genes are part of an operon of Methanosarcina barkeri, with homologues in other sequenced members of the Methanosarcinaceae family: M. acetivorans, M. mazei, and M. thermophila.  Pyrrolysine-containing genes are known to include monomethylamine methyltransferase (mtmB), dimethylamine methyltransferase (mtbB), and trimethylamine methyltransferase (mttB).  Homologs of pylS and pylT have also been found in an Antarctic archaeon, Methanosarcina barkeri and a Gram-positive bacterium, Desulfitobacterium hafniense.

The occurrence in Desulfitobacterium is of special interest, because bacteria and archaea are separate domains in the three-domain system by which living things are classified.  When use of the amino acid appeared confined to the Methanosarcinaceae, the system was described as a "late archaeal invention" by which a 21st amino acid was added to the genetic code.  Afterward it was concluded that "PylRS was already present in the last
universal common ancestor" some 3 billion years ago, but it only persisted in organisms using methylamines as energy sources.  Another possibility is that evolution of the system involved a horizontal gene transfer between unrelated microorganisms.  The other genes of the Pyl operon mediate pyrrolysine biosynthesis, leading to description of the operon as a "natural genetic code expansion cassette".

Some differences exist between the bacterial and archaeal systems studied.  Homology to pylS is broken into two separate proteins in D. hafniense.  Most notably, the UAG codon appears to act as a stop codon in many of that organism's proteins, with only a single established use in coding pyrrolysine in that organism.  By contrast, in methanogenic archaea it was not possible to identify any unambiguous UAG stop signal.  Because there was only one known site where pyrrolysine is added in D. hafniense it was not possible to determine whether some additional sequence feature, analogous to the SECIS element for selenocysteine incorporation, might control when pyrrolysine is added.  It was previously proposed that a specific downstream sequence "PYLIS", forming a stem-loop in the mRNA, forced the incorporation of pyrrolysine instead of terminating translation in methanogenic archaea.  However, the PYLIS model has lost favor in view of the lack of structural homology between PYLIS elements and the lack of UAG stops in those species.

Potential for an alternative translation
The tRNA(CUA) can be charged with lysine in vitro by the concerted action of the M. barkeri Class I and Class II Lysyl-tRNA synthetases, which do not recognize pyrrolysine.  Charging a tRNA(CUA) with lysine was originally hypothesized to be the first step in translating UAG amber codons as pyrrolysine, a mechanism analogous to that used for selenocysteine.  More recent data favor direct charging of pyrrolysine on to the tRNA(CUA) by the protein product of the pylS gene, leading to the suggestion that the LysRS1:LysRS2 complex may participate in a parallel pathway designed to ensure that proteins containing the UAG codon can be fully translated using lysine as a substitute amino acid in the event of pyrrolysine deficiency.  Further study found that the genes encoding LysRS1 and LysRS2 are not required for normal growth on methanol and methylamines with normal methyltransferase levels, and they cannot replace pylS in a recombinant system for UAG amber stop codon suppression.

References

Further reading

External links
 

Proteinogenic amino acids
Pyrrolines
Secondary amino acids